Ann(e) Glover may refer to:

 Anne Glover (biologist) (born 1956), Scottish biologist
 Anne Glover (venture capitalist) (born 1954), CEO and co-founder of Amadeus Capital Partners
Ann Glover (died 1688), hanged as a witch